Gary or Garry Smith may refer to:

Music
 Gary Smith (drummer) (born 1950), member of Chase and Survivor
 Gary Smith (guitarist), British avant-garde guitarist, improviser and composer
 Gary Smith (heavy metal guitarist)
 Gary Smith (record producer), entrepreneur, record producer, and artists' manager

Politics
 Garry R. Smith (born 1957), American politician in South Carolina
 Gary Smith Jr. (born 1972), American politician in Louisiana
 Gary Smith (political candidate), 2012 New Mexican congressional candidate
 Gary Smith, burgess of Woodsboro, Maryland

Sports
 Gary Smith (cricketer) (born 1958), South African cricketer
 Gary Smith (footballer, born 1955), English footballer
 Gary Smith (footballer, born 1966), St Kitts and Nevis international footballer
 Gary Smith (footballer, born 1968), English football player and coach
 Gary Smith (footballer, born 1971), Scottish footballer
 Gary Smith (footballer, born 1984), English footballer
 Gary Smith (footballer, born 1991), Scottish footballer
 Gary Smith (ice hockey) (born 1944), ice hockey goaltender
 Gary Smith (bowls) (born 1958), English world indoor champion bowler
 Gary R Smith (born 1962), English bowls player
 Gary Smith (rugby league, York born) (born 1963), English rugby league footballer who played in the 1970s and 1980s
 Gary Smith (rugby league) (born 1963), Australian rugby league footballer who played in the 1980s and 1990s
 Garry Smith (rugby league), New Zealand international
 Gary Smith (sailor) (born 1952), Australian Olympic sailor

Other
 Gary Smith (EDA analyst) (1941–2015), electronic design automation business analyst
 Gary Smith (economist) (born 1945), economist, author
 Gary Smith (Ciena CEO), telecommunications industry executive
 Gary Smith (sportswriter) (born 1953), long-time writer for Sports Illustrated
 Gary T. Smith (born 1954), American screenwriter, actor and director
 Gary Smith (philosopher) (born 1954), American philosopher and culture manager
 Gary Mark Smith (born 1956), American street photographer
 Gary Smith (trade unionist), Scottish trade union leader
 Gary Smith, the main antagonist of the video game Bully

See also
Gary Smyth (born 1969), Northern Irish footballer
Gary Smyth (loyalist), Northern Irish former loyalist paramilitary